Joanne Loundes, a public sector economist, is the Australian Ambassador to Iraq (since March 2018).

Loundes earned a Doctor of Philosophy from the University of Melbourne and a Bachelor of Economics from Murdoch University.

References

Living people
Year of birth missing (living people)
Australian women economists
Ambassadors of Australia to Iraq
University of Melbourne alumni
Murdoch University alumni